|}

The Dewhurst Stakes is a Group 1 flat horse race in Great Britain open to two-year-old colts and fillies. It is run on the Rowley Mile at Newmarket over a distance of 7 furlongs (1,408 metres), and it is scheduled to take place each year in October.

It is Britain's most prestigious race for juvenile horses. The leading participants usually become major contenders for the following season's Classics.

History
The event was founded by Thomas Gee, who was a close friend of Karl Pearson's father. It was established in 1875 and was originally titled the "Dewhurst Plate". It is named after Gee's Dewhurst Stud at Wadhurst. The first four winners all went on to win one or more of the next year's Classics.

The race was formerly staged during Newmarket's Champions' Day meeting in mid-October. It became part of a new fixture called Future Champions Day in 2011.

The Dewhurst Stakes was added to the Breeders' Cup Challenge series in 2011. The winner was given an automatic invitation to compete in the Breeders' Cup Juvenile Turf. It was removed from the series in 2012.

The most recent winner of the Dewhurst Stakes to achieve a Classic victory is St Mark's Basilica, the winner of the Poule d'Essai des Poulains and Prix du Jockey Club in 2021.

Records

Leading jockey (10 wins):
 Lester Piggott – Crepello (1956), Follow Suit (1962), Ribofilio (1968), Nijinsky (1969), Crowned Prince (1971), Cellini (1973), The Minstrel (1976), Try My Best (1977), Monteverdi (1979), Diesis (1982)

Leading trainer (8 wins):
 John Porter – Paradox (1884), Ormonde (1885), Friar's Balsam (1887), Orme (1891), Matchbox (1893), Vesuvian (1896), Hawfinch (1897), Frontier (1898)
 Frank Butters – Toboggan (1927), Mrs Rustom (1933), Hairan (1934), Bala Hissar (1935), Sultan Mahomed (1936), Umiddad (1942), Paper Weight (1944), Migoli (1946)

Leading owner (8 wins):
 HH Aga Khan III – Salmon-Trout (1923), Zionist (1924), Firdaussi (1931), Mrs Rustom (1933), Hairan (1934), Bala Hissar (1935), Umiddad (1942), Migoli (1946)

Winners

A ‡ designates a filly.

See also
 Horse racing in Great Britain
 List of British flat horse races
 Recurring sporting events established in 1875 – this race is included under its original title, Dewhurst Plate.

References
 Paris-Turf: 
 Racing Post:

 galopp-sieger.de – Dewhurst Stakes (ex Dewhurst Plate).
 ifhaonline.org – International Federation of Horseracing Authorities – Dewhurst Stakes (2019).
 pedigreequery.com – Dewhurst Stakes – Newmarket.
 
 YouTube Race Video https://www.youtube.com/playlist?list=PLfn5x2SD03q76qbURuaziXRLxQtsMt6jG

Flat races in Great Britain
Newmarket Racecourse
Flat horse races for two-year-olds
1875 establishments in England